Pringy may refer to:

In France
 Pringy, Marne, in the Marne département
 Pringy, Haute-Savoie, in the Haute-Savoie département
 Pringy, Seine-et-Marne, in the Seine-et-Marne département

In Switzerland
 Pringy, Gruyère, village in the Gruyère (district)